David Alfred Pierpoint is an Irish Anglican priest: he has been Archdeacon of Dublin since 2004.

Pierpoint was born in 1956 and ordained in 1988. He was Non Stipendiary Minister at Athboy with Ballivor and Killallon; Killiney and Ballybrack; and Narraghmore and Timolin with Castledermot until 1991 when he became Chancellor of St Patrick's Cathedral, Dublin. In 1995 he became its Vicar.

References

1956 births
Living people
Archdeacons of Dublin